The 12th Independent Spirit Awards, honoring the best in independent filmmaking for 1996, were announced on March 22, 1997.  It was hosted by Samuel L. Jackson.

Nominees and winners

{| class="wikitable"
!Best Feature
!Best Director
|-
|Fargo

Dead Man
The Funeral
Loved
Welcome to the Dollhouse
|Joel Coen – Fargo

Abel Ferrara – The Funeral
David O. Russell – Flirting with Disaster
Todd Solondz – Welcome to the Dollhouse
Robert M. Young – Caught
|-
!Best Male Lead
!Best Female Lead
|-
|William H. Macy – Fargo

Chris Cooper – Lone Star
Chris Penn – The Funeral
Tony Shalhoub – Big Night
Stanley Tucci – Big Night
|Frances McDormand – Fargo

María Conchita Alonso – Caught
Scarlett Johansson – Manny & Lo
Catherine Keener – Walking and Talking
Renée Zellweger – The Whole Wide World
|-
!Best Supporting Male
!Best Supporting Female
|-
|Benicio del Toro – Basquiat

Kevin Corrigan – Walking and Talking
Matthew Faber – Welcome to the Dollhouse
Gary Farmer – Dead Man
Richard Jenkins – Flirting with Disaster
|Elizabeth Peña – Lone Star

Mary Kay Place – Manny & Lo
Queen Latifah – Set It Off
Lili Taylor – Girls Town
Lily Tomlin – Flirting with Disaster
|-
!Best Screenplay
!Best First Screenplay
|-
|Fargo – Joel Coen and Ethan CoenDead Man – Jim Jarmusch
Flirting with Disaster – David O. Russell
The Funeral – Nicholas St. John
Lone Star – John Sayles
|Big Night – Joseph Tropiano and Stanley TucciGirl 6 – Suzan-Lori Parks
Manny & Lo – Lisa Krueger
Trees Lounge – Steve Buscemi
The Whole Wide World – Michael Scott Myers
|-
!Best First Feature
!Best Debut Performance
|-
|Sling Blade

Big Night
I Shot Andy Warhol
Manny & Lo
Trees Lounge
|Heather Matarazzo – Welcome to the Dollhouse

Jena Malone – Bastard Out of Carolina
Brendan Sexton III – Welcome to the Dollhouse
Arie Verveen – Caught
Jeffrey Wright – Basquiat
|-
!Best Cinematography
!Best Foreign Film
|-
|Fargo – Roger DeakinsBound – Bill Pope
Color of a Brisk and Leaping Day – Rob Sweeney
Dead Man – Robby Müller
The Funeral – Ken Kelsch
|Secrets & Lies • UKBreaking the Waves • Denmark
Chungking Express • Hong Kong
Lamerica • Italy
Trainspotting • UK
|}

 Films that received multiple nominations 

 Films that won multiple awards 

Special awards

Truer Than Fiction AwardWhen We Were Kings
The Celluloid Closet
Looking for Richard
Paradise Lost: The Child Murders at Robin Hood Hills
Troublesome Creek: A Midwestern

Someone to Watch Award
Larry Fessenden – Habit
Joe Brewster – The Keeper
Chris Smith – American Job

References

External links 
1996 Spirit Awards at IMDb
The full show on Film Independent's official YouTube channel

1996
Independent Spirit Awards